Cyfrowy Polsat S.A. (English: Digital Polsat), trading as Polsat Box is a Polish DTH satellite TV platform. It is the fifth-largest digital platform in Europe and the largest in Central and Eastern Europe. Polsat Box has 3.47 million subscribers and, along with its associated mobile network Plus, are the major brands of Grupa Polsat Plus, the trade name of Cyfrowy Polsat S.A. corporate group.

Cyfrowy Polsat S.A. is, from April 2011, the owner of Polsat. The financing of the acquisition of Polsat in May 2011 was possible due to issuing of shares and external sources. With Polsat, Cyfrowy was able to add a very important standing leg to its portfolio regarding TV production and broadcasting.

History 

Polsat Box was launched on 5 December 1999 as Polsat 2 Cyfrowy. The platform was known as Cyfrowy Polsat from 13 June 2003 until 30 August 2021.

Packages of Polsat Box
 Pakiet S
 Pakiet M
 Pakiet M Sport
 Pakiet L

Additional options
 Disney+
 Polsat Sport Premium
 Eleven Sports
 Canal+ Sport 3 and 4
 Sport Max
 HBO, HBO Max
 Cinemax
 FilmBox Pack
 Catalogue of VOD movies
 Rozrywka
 Dzieci

See also
 Television in Poland
 Polsat

References

External links 
  
 Corporate website

Direct broadcast satellite services
Television networks in Poland
Telecommunications companies of Poland
Companies based in Warsaw
Mass media companies established in 2011
Companies listed on the Warsaw Stock Exchange
Polsat
Polish companies established in 2011